The Thul Hairo Khan (Sindhi: ٺلھ هيرو خان) is a Buddhist Stupa, built possibly between the 5th to 7th century CE near the modern-day town of Johi, in Sindh, Pakistan. It is constructed with baked and unbaked bricks fixed with a material made from mud mixed water. The stupa is 50 feet high and 30 feet wide in size. The stair from the north side of stupa leads to its top. The stupa has an arched tunnel at ground level which crosses from north to south. It is believed that stupas like Hairo Khan were built in Sindh between 5th to 7th centuries CE. Thul of Hairo Khan appears to be series of discovered in other regions of Sindh.

History
According to some accounts Buddhism spread in Sindh in 3rd century BCE during the period of Emperor Ashoka of Maurya Empire. Chandragupta Maurya was founder of Maurya Empire who was supported by kingdoms of Sindh and Punjab, defeated Greek dominance there. Sindh became division of Maurya Empire in 305 BCE; and during Maurya Empire Buddhism thrived in Sindh at large, particularly through the realm of Ashoka the Great. During the time of Mauryan rule Sindhi monks (Bhikshus) had attended the second and third Buddhist councils held in 278 BC and 253 BC.  
Faxian who came to Sindh in 641 CE and had recorded eighty-eight thousands stupas up to borders of Sindh. Sindh was hub of Buddhism during Rai Dynasty. Chach was a pioneer of Brahman dynasty of Sindh. His brother Chandra was Buddhist. According to Chach Nama, a first written source material on history of Sindh, during the monarchy of Rai kings together with Brahmans, Buddhiya country (division) was part of Sindh, which indicates to Buddhism as dominant religion in Sindh. Buddhism remained and grew in every part of Sindh till 13th century CE in Soomra dynasty of Sindh. Stupas were considered as sacred and religious remains of Buddhism.

Construction
The construction of Thul Hairo Khan is a rectangular type. The measurement of round shaped top of stupa is 5’-11" while the measurement of circumference is 14’0". The baked bricks used in stupa are of 11"x 6"x 2" size. Whereas, the baked bricks used in round shape like circle at the top of stupa are 11.6"x 2"x 5" in size.

Location
Thul Hairo Khan is located towards west of village Hairo Khan at walking distance and it is situated towards north of village Haji Khan Laghari in (Kachho) Taluka Johi, Dadu District of Sindh  at distance of 10 kilometers and towards north-east of Johi Town at distance of 15 kilometer; at Latitude: 26°49'40.3", Longitude: 67°28'28.81.

References

Stupas in Pakistan
History of Sindh
Archaeological sites in Sindh
Ancient history of Pakistan
Ruins in Pakistan
Tourist attractions in Sindh
Dadu District